The Ritz-Carlton, Toronto is a luxury hotel and residential condominium building in Toronto, Ontario, Canada. At , it is one of the tallest buildings in Toronto. It is located at 181 Wellington Street West, on the western edge of the downtown core and bordering Toronto's entertainment district. The hotel opened on February 16, 2011.

Architecture
The exterior consists of an outwardly sloped neomodern glass facade, giving it a distinctive profile on Toronto's skyline. The interior includes 263 hotel rooms as well as 159 Ritz-Carlton managed condominiums. The hotel occupies the lower 20 floors; floors 21 and 22 are used for condominium amenities and some residences, while floors 23 to 52 hold the remaining condominium residences. The penthouse suite occupies the entire 52nd floor, while the 53rd floor houses building mechanical equipment. The skyscraper includes a  spa.

See also
 List of tallest buildings in Toronto
 List of tallest buildings in Canada
 Ritz-Carlton Hotels

References

External links
 The Ritz-Carlton hotel website
 The Ritz-Carlton Residences
 Ritz-Carlton Toronto Review
 Ritz-Carlton Toronto on urbandb.com

Kohn Pedersen Fox buildings
Residential skyscrapers in Toronto
Residential condominiums in Canada
Residential buildings completed in 2011
Toronto
Hotels in Toronto
Condo hotels in Canada
Skyscraper hotels in Canada